Lucina Elena da Costa Gomez-Matheeuws (5 April 1929 – 7 January 2017) was a Dutch Antillean politician for the National People's Party (PNP). She served as the ad interim Prime Minister of the Netherlands Antilles, an office her husband Moises Frumencio da Costa Gomez previously held, briefly in 1977. She was also the first female to hold the office. Prior to this, she was the Minister of Health and Environment, Welfare, Youth, Sports, Culture and Recreation (1970–1977).

Costa Gomez-Matheeuws died on 7 January 2017 at the age of 87.

References

1929 births
2017 deaths
Prime Ministers of the Netherlands Antilles
Government ministers of the Netherlands Antilles
Members of the Estates of the Netherlands Antilles
Dutch Antillean women in politics
Curaçao women in politics
National People's Party (Curaçao) politicians
Place of birth missing
20th-century Dutch women politicians
20th-century Dutch politicians
Women prime ministers